The 2016 Penn State Nittany Lions football team represented Pennsylvania State University in the 2016 NCAA Division I FBS football season. The team was led by third-year head coach James Franklin and played its home games in Beaver Stadium in University Park, Pennsylvania. They were a member of the Big Ten East Division of the Big Ten Conference. They lost to Pitt and Michigan in early September but then had a winning streak that included signature victories over Ohio State and Wisconsin en route to a Big Ten championship. Despite their Big Ten title, the Nittany Lions just missed a playoff berth. They represented the Big Ten in the 2017 Rose Bowl, losing to USC on a game winning field goal.

Background

Previous season
During the previous season the Nittany Lions started the year with a 5–1 record and 2–0 in Big Ten play. Then on October, 17 they lost to #1 ranked Ohio State. After which they won their next two games including a 39–0 rout over Illinois. Following the rout the Nittany Lions finished the year 0–4 including losses to #6 Michigan State and #14 Michigan and a bowl game loss to Georgia.

2016 NFL Draft

Schedule

Overview
Penn State announced its 2016 football schedule on July 11, 2013. The 2016 schedule consists of 7 home and 5 away games in the regular season. The Nittany Lions hosted Big Ten foes Iowa, Maryland, Michigan State, Minnesota, and Ohio State, and traveled to Indiana, Michigan, Purdue, and Rutgers.

The team hosted two of the three non-conference games against the Kent State Golden Flashes from the Mid-American Conference (MAC), Pittsburgh Panthers from the Atlantic Coast Conference (ACC), and the Temple Owls from the American Athletic Conference (AAC).

Schedule Source:

Roster

Coaching staff

Rankings

Game summaries

Kent State

Pittsburgh

Temple

#4 Michigan

Minnesota

Maryland

#2 Ohio State

Purdue

Iowa

Indiana

Rutgers

Michigan State

#6 Wisconsin (Big Ten Championship Game)

#9 USC (Rose Bowl)

Awards and honors

Players

Coaches

References

Penn State
Penn State Nittany Lions football seasons
Big Ten Conference football champion seasons
Lambert-Meadowlands Trophy seasons
Penn State Nittany Lions football